Anthony Steven Weiss AM PhD FRSC FTSE FRSN FRACI, FTERM, FBSE is a university researcher, company founder and entrepreneur. He is the leading scientist in human tropoelastin research and synthetic human elastin. He holds the McCaughey Chair in Biochemistry, heads the Charles Perkins Centre Node in Tissue Engineering and Regenerative Medicine, and is Professor of Biochemistry and Molecular Biotechnology at the University of Sydney. His discoveries are on human elastic materials that accelerate the healing and repair of arteries, skin and 3D human tissue components. He is a Fellow of the Royal Society of Chemistry. Weiss is on the editorial boards of the American Chemical Society Biomaterials Science and Engineering, Applied Materials Today (Elsevier), Biomaterials, Biomedical Materials, BioNanoScience (Springer) and Tissue Engineering (Mary Ann Liebert, Inc.). He is a biotechnology company founder, promoter of national and international technology development, and has received national and international awards, including the Order of Australia.

His awards include the Eureka Prize for Innovation in Medical Research, Clunies Ross Award, NSW Premier's Prize for Science & Engineering Leadership in Innovation, Innovator of Influence, Applied Research Medal given by the Royal Australian Chemical Institute, Federation of Asian and Oceanian Biochemists & Molecular Biologists Entrepreneurship Award, Australasian Society for Biomaterials & Tissue Engineering Research Excellence Award, and Fulbright Scholar. He was President of the Matrix Biology Society of Australia and New Zealand, elected as Chair Asia-Pacific and the Governing Board of Tissue Engineering and Regenerative Medicine International Society and then elected as global President of the Tissue Engineering and Regenerative Medicine International Society. In 2021 he was awarded the Prime Minister's Prize for Innovation.

Early life and education
Anthony Weiss was born in Sydney, Australia and received his PhD from the University of Sydney. He was a Fulbright Scholar at Stanford University and NIH Fogarty International Fellow. He is a Fellow of the Royal Society of Chemistry, Fellow of the Australian Academy of Technology and Engineering, Fellow of the Royal Society of NSW, Fellow of the Royal Australian Chemical Institute and Chartered Chemist, Fellow of the American Institute for Medical and Biological Engineering, Fellow of Tissue Engineering and Regenerative Medicine (FTERM) and Fellow of Biomaterials Science and Engineering.

References

Academic staff of the University of Sydney
Fellows of the Australian Institute of Company Directors
Fellows of the Royal Society of Chemistry
Academic journal editors
Year of birth missing (living people)
Living people
Fellows of the Australian Academy of Technological Sciences and Engineering
Fellows of the American Institute for Medical and Biological Engineering
Members of the Order of Australia